The Columbus Theatre is a movie theater and concert venue in Providence, Rhode Island. The theater is located at 270 Broadway in the city's Broadway–Armory Historic District.

History
The building was designed by architect Oreste DiSaia and built by realtor Domenic Annotti in 1926. DiSaia designed it to be “outdated”. Art Deco was the fashion of the time but he designed it as “a 19th-century Italianate palace.”

When opened, the theater featured vaudeville and silent films before it was leased by RKO Albee Theater. It was considered “one of Providence’s premier cinemas for the next 25 years.”. In 1929, it was renamed the Uptown Theatre.

They fell on hard times until Misak Berberian bought it in the summer of 1962. He returned it to original name.  With his son Jon in charge, they renovated the theatre. After extensive repairs, they reopened the Theatre on November 1, 1962 (the 36th anniversary of the original opening).  They closed again in 2009 to make necessary “fire updates” required after the Station nightclub fire and reopened November 17, 2012.

When Jon took over, he programmed second-run movies, a few operas and recitals. But facing competition from the multiplexes that opened in Providence, they began showing porn.  Since the most recent renovation, they showcase a variety of entertainment including live performances.  Performers have included John C. Reilly and his band, John Reilly and Friends.

The Columbus Cooperative runs the Theatre.  They have two theatres - the small theatre upstairs seats 200, and the large theatre seats 800. The Columbus Cooperative includes the Providence folk band The Low Anthem, whose members assist in planning events such as film screenings and concerts.

References

Cinemas and movie theaters in Rhode Island
Theatres in Rhode Island
Buildings and structures in Providence, Rhode Island
Italianate architecture in Rhode Island
Theatres completed in 1926
1926 establishments in Rhode Island